Twisting and Shouting is the third album released by The Isley Brothers in 1963, credited as The Famous Isley Brothers,  on the United Artists label. Their third album after Twist & Shout one year prior, the album was released with none of the songs making the singles chart, and preceded a three-year gap before the brothers' next album, This Old Heart of Mine (1966), which would see them move to Berry Gordy's Motown label. In 1991, the album was reissued on CD with extra tracks and retitled The Complete United Artists Sessions.

Track listing

Personnel
The Isley Brothers
Ronald Isley – lead vocals
O'Kelly Isley, Jr. and Rudolph Isley – background vocals
Technical
Alan Lorber, Garry Sherman – conductor

References

External links
 The Isley Brothers - Twisting and Shouting (1963) album review by Ron Wynn, credits & releases at AllMusic
 The Isley Brothers - Twisting and Shouting (1963) album releases & credits at Discogs
 The Isley Brothers - The Complete UA Sessions (1991) album review by Bruce Eder, credits & releases at AllMusic
 The Isley Brothers - The Complete UA Sessions (1991) album releases & credits at Discogs
 The Isley Brothers - The Complete United Artists Sessions (1991) album to be listened as stream on Spotify

1963 albums
The Isley Brothers albums
Albums produced by Bert Berns
United Artists Records albums